Ionic transfer is the transfer of ions from one liquid phase to another. This is related to the phase transfer catalysts which are a special type of liquid-liquid extraction which is used in synthetic chemistry.

For instance nitrate anions can be transferred between water and nitrobenzene. One way to observe this is to use a cyclic voltammetry experiment where the liquid-liquid interface is the working electrode. This can be done by placing secondary electrodes in each phase and close to interface each phase has a reference electrode. One phase is attached to a potentiostat which is set to zero volts, while the other potentiostat is driven with a triangular wave. This experiment is known as a polarised Interface between Two Immiscible Electrolyte Solutions (ITIES) experiment.

See also 
 Diffusion potential

References

Physical chemistry
Ions